The 1959–60 season was the 36th season in the existence of AEK Athens F.C. and the first season in the top flight of Greek football. They competed in the Alpha Ethniki and the Greek Cup. The season began on 23 September 1959 and finished on 31 July 1960.

Overview

From the previous season, discussions had started to be launched for the creation of a single championship of a national division. The HFF was divided and hesitated to decide, as the reactions of the local unions were varied. However, two factors were decisive in the final decision of the Greek football officials. On the one hand, the ever-intensifying pressures of UEFA for the establishment of a national division championship so that the representation of Greece in the European Cups would become more meritorious and on the other hand, the government's will to institutionalize the PRO-PO, led the HFF to the creation and establishment of the first and second national divisions and the replacement of the regional championships with a single national championship.

In the summer of 1959, AEK were strengthened with the striker, Stefanos Demiris, the goalkeeper, Kimon Dimitriou, central defender, Dimitris Diakakis and 26-year-old Giannis Marditsis from Egaleo. The signings were not buzzing as everyone felt that the squad was complete and ready to win the championship. AEK, being the only contender against the omnipotence of Olympiacos in the 1950's, entered the new championship focused exclusively on winning the title. After all, they were one step away from the previous season's title, when in the last match at the Karaiskakis Stadium they led by 0–2 in the first 10 minutes, but were tied and the title eventually went to the red and whites.

At the beginning season in the Cup, AEK faced and eliminated with characteristic ease and big scores a series of teams of smaller categories, such as Proodos Patisia with a 5–0 victory, Victoria with a 7–1 victory, Ilisiakos with a 3–1 victory, Dafni Athens with a 3–1 victory, PAO Kalogreza with 7-0 victory and Atromitos with a 1–0 victory. AEK were not be able to qualify for the round of 16 of the tournament as in the round of 32, as they faced the away defeat by 2–0 and the elimination by Olympiacos Chalkida on 10 April. Vlachos scored both goals for the club of Chalkida in the 50th and 88th minute.

The first championship of the first national division started on 25 October and the captain of AEK, Giannis Kanakis was the scorer of its first ever goal, when in the 3rd minute of the match against Ethnikos Piraeus at the Karaiskakis Stadium shaped the final 0–1 for AEK. However, the "dark clouds" did not take long to make their appearance, showing in the most emphatic way that the renaming of the Championship and the change in the way it was conducted did not automatically mean the termination of the issues of previous years. Only in the 11th matchday on 17 January, AEK played in Thessaloniki facing Aris and while the score was 2–1 with goals from Grigoriadis, Sismanidis and Giorgos Petridis, in the 84th minute the Piraeus referee Damalitis in the midst of constant changes of decisions and vacillating between suggesting a penalty or an indirect overturning of an AEK player in the area of Aris, caused a conflict between the players and stop the match which was repeated ten days later with the Italian referee Eugenio Rigato and showed the two teams tied at 2-2. The serious injury of Kostas Nestoridis in the home match against Proodeftiki on 24 January kept him away from the stadiums for about a month and AEK away from the 3 points of victory as during this period AEK achieved 3 draws. The final tie at the top with Panathinaikos proved the importance of these ties. Against everyone the Union was kept alive in the hunt for the title and being a pioneer, competed on 18 June at the Karaiskakis Stadium, against Proodeftiki. The pitch turned into a fighting arena and after a lot of banter between the players and several expulsions, it ended with a 2–2 draw with Serafidis and Petridis among the expelled. The strange thing about the story was that although the referee Začević had not recorded their suspensions on the match sheet, the two players were punished based on the report of the observer and their monthly ban finally took effect starting from the title play-off against Panathinaikos. Even under these conditions, AEK remained first with a 2-point difference from the second Panathinaikos, until the fateful day of 24 July when they line up at the Nea Smyrni Stadium against Panionios. The rumors were talking all week about the friendly relations of Kostas Nestoridis with his former teammates at Panionios and discounting a comfortable victory for AEK. The rebuttal came in force as Panionios took the lead with 2–0, Nestoridis reduced it to 2–1, the red and blues made it 3–1 and the own goal of Kazantzidis in the 90th minute simply made the score 3–2, proving that for the players of Panionios, duty prevailed over friendship. It did not prove to be the same at the Karaiskakis Stadium, where at the same time Olympiacos, leading at the half-time with 1–0 against the "greens", thought that duty and "friendship" can be shared by a half-time and underperforming the second half, were defeated by 1–4 from Panathinaikos giving them the points needed to get in the tie with AEK and participate in the championship play-off.

The play-off match on the last day of July found AEK decimated by suspensions, with Sotiris Fakis under the goalposts for the first time and disappointed by the turn the Championship race took as a result of Panathinaikos prevailing 2–1 despite a 0–1 lead given to AEK by Christos Ampos in the 14th minute, and the first title of the First Division was dressed in green. In all this several clubs had contributed, including Panionios and Apollon Athens, who citing success at the box office and financial support of their coffers, had accepted, with the title race in its final stretch, the holding of their home games against Panathinaikos in their bigger home ground of Leoforos Alexandras Stadium.

The end of the season found AEK in second place in the Championship having the best attack with 77 goals and Kostas Nestoridis the top scorer with 33 goals in 27 matches, who in several games seemed to take them by the hand and single-handedly lead them to their first post-war title. From about the middle of the season, the greatest post-war captain of AEK, Giannis Kanakis, had left the footballing action, while at the end of the season, Thanasis Tsangaris, Loukas Sismanis and Kostas Zografos also departed.

Players

Squad information

NOTE: The players are the ones that have been announced by the AEK Athens' press release. No edits should be made unless a player arrival or exit is announced. Updated 31 July 1960, 23:59 UTC+2.

Transfers

In

 a.  plus Stavros Giafaloglou, Giannis Chaniotis and Kostas Chatzimichail.

Out

Overall transfer activity

Expenditure:  ₯203,000

Income:  ₯0

Net Total:  ₯203,000

Pre-season and friendlies

Alpha Ethniki

League table

Results summary

Results by Matchday

Fixtures

Championship play-off

Greek Cup

Matches

Statistics

Squad statistics

! colspan="9" style="background:#FFDE00; text-align:center" | Goalkeepers
|-

! colspan="9" style="background:#FFDE00; color:black; text-align:center;"| Defenders
|-

! colspan="9" style="background:#FFDE00; color:black; text-align:center;"| Midfielders
|-

! colspan="9" style="background:#FFDE00; color:black; text-align:center;"| Forwards
|-

|}

Disciplinary record

|-
! colspan="14" style="background:#FFDE00; text-align:center" | Goalkeepers

|-
! colspan="14" style="background:#FFDE00; color:black; text-align:center;"| Defenders

|-
! colspan="14" style="background:#FFDE00; color:black; text-align:center;"| Midfielders

|-
! colspan="14" style="background:#FFDE00; color:black; text-align:center;"| Forwards

|-
|}

References

External links
 AEK Athens F.C. Official Website

AEK Athens F.C. seasons
AEK Athens